Garra kalpangi is a species of cyprinid fish in the genus Garra which is described from the Kalpangi River at Yachuli (Brahmaputra River system), Lower Subansiri District, Arunachal Pradesh, India.

Description

The species is closely similar to G. gravelyi, G. rotundinasus and G.elongata in having a shared character i.e. a weakly developed proboscis.

Etymology

Name is given as noun in apposition after the name of the River Kalpangi.

References 

Garra
Taxa named by Kongbrailatpan Nebeshwar Sharma 
Taxa named by Kenjum Bagra 
Taxa named by Debangshu Narayan Das
Fish described in 2012